The women's tournament of the 2016 European Curling Championships was held from November 18 to 26 in Renfrewshire, Scotland. The winners of the Group C tournament in Ljubljana, Slovenia moved on to the Group B tournament. The top eight women's teams at the 2016 European Curling Championships will represent their respective nations at the 2017 World Women's Curling Championship in Beijing.

The tournament saw the debut of the Italian team. The Czech team for the first time got into the semifinals. Furthermore, the Russian team headed by skip Victoria Moiseeva debuted on these championships, following their win over Sidorova's defending champion team in the Russian Supercup. Team Russia won the trophy, defeating Team Sweden in the final.

Group A

Teams

Round-robin standings
Final round-robin standings

Draw 1
Saturday, November 19, 14:00

Draw 2
Sunday, November 20, 08:00

Draw 3
Sunday, November 20, 16:00

Draw 4
Monday, November 21, 12:00

Draw 5
Monday, November 21, 20:00

Draw 6
Tuesday, November 22, 14:00

Draw 7
Wednesday, November 23, 8:00

Draw 8
Wednesday, November 23, 16:00

Draw 9
Thursday, November 24, 09:00

World Challenge Games
The World Challenge Games are held between the eighth-ranked team in the Group A round robin and the winner of the Group B tournament to determine which of these two teams will play at the World Championships.

Challenge 1
Friday, November 25, 19:00

Challenge 2
Saturday, November 26, 9:00

Playoffs

Semifinals
Friday, November 25, 14:00

Bronze-medal game
Friday, November 28, 19:00

Gold-medal game
Saturday, November 26, 11:00

Player percentages
Round Robin only

Group B

Teams

Round-robin standings
Final round-robin standings

Round-robin results

Draw 1
Saturday, November 19, 09:00

Draw 2
Saturday, November 19, 20:00

Draw 3
Sunday, November 20, 12:00

Draw 4
Sunday, November 20, 20:00

Draw 5
Monday, November 21, 12:00

Draw 6
Monday, November 21, 20:00

Draw 7
Tuesday, November 22, 12:00

Draw 8
Tuesday, November 22, 20:00

Draw 9
Wednesday, November 23, 08:00

Draw 10
Wednesday, November 23, 12:00

Draw 11
Wednesday, November 23, 16:00

Draw 12
Wednesday, November 23, 20:00

Placement game
Thursday, November 24, 09:00

Tiebreaker
Thursday, November 24, 09:00

Playoffs

Semifinals
Thursday, November 24, 14:30

Bronze-medal game
Friday, November 25, 13:00

Gold-medal game
Friday, November 25, 13:00

Group C

Teams

Round-robin standings
Final round-robin standings

Round-robin results

Draw 1

Draw 2

Draw 3

Draw 4

Draw 5

Draw 6

Draw 7

Playoffs

1 vs. 2

Winner advances to Group B competitions.
Loser advances to Second Place Game.

3 vs. 4

Winner advances to Second Place Game.

Second Place Game

Winner advances to Group B competitions.

References
General

Specific

2016 in Scottish women's sport
European Curling Championships
European Curling Championships
European Curling Championships
Women's curling competitions in Scotland